Sinapidendron is a genus of flowering plants belonging to the family Brassicaceae.

Its native range is Madeira.

Species:

Sinapidendron angustifolium 
Sinapidendron frutescens 
Sinapidendron gymnocalyx 
Sinapidendron rupestre 
Sinapidendron sempervivifolium

References

Brassicaceae
Brassicaceae genera